Arthur Ranken (23 October 1806 – 24 September 1886) was Dean of Aberdeen and Orkney from 1880  to 1886.

He was born at Tyrie, Aberdeenshire in 1806, and educated at Marischal College and the University of Aberdeen and ordained in 1829. After a curacy at Portsoy  he was the incumbent at Mintlaw and then at Old Deer until his death, holding the appointment as Dean 
in addition for the last six years of his life.

He died on 24 September 1886.

Notes

External links

1806 births
1886 deaths
Alumni of the University of Aberdeen
Deans of Aberdeen and Orkney